Lipovsky or Lipovský may refer to:
 Lipovsky,  rural locality (a khutor) in Perelazovskoye Rural Settlement, Kletsky District, Volgograd Oblast, Russia

People with the surname
 Miroslav Lipovský (1976), Slovak ice hockey player
 Zach Lipovsky, Canadian director, former child actor and visual effects specialist

See also 
 Lipowski